Ayrarat was the central province of the ancient kingdom Armenia, located in the plain of the upper Aras River. Most of the historical capitals of Armenia were located in this province, including Armavir, Yervandashat, Artashat, Vagharshapat, Dvin, Bagaran, Shirakavan, Kars and Ani (the current capital of Armenia, Yerevan, is also located on the territory of historical Ayrarat).

Name 
The name  is clearly connected with Uruatri/Urartu and the biblical Ararat, and perhaps also with the Alarodians mentioned by Herodotus. It is not used by any of the classical Greek and Roman authors who write about Armenia, which suggests that it was a purely local name used to refer to the central lands of Armenia. Robert H. Hewsen does not rule out the possibility that Armenians applied the name to the great plain surrounding Mount Masis after converting to Christianity in the early fourth century and identifying the biblical Ararat with Masis.

The ultimate etymology of the names Urartu, Ayrarat, and Ararat is not known for certain. In the Armenian tradition, Ayrarat and the Ararat plain are associated with the legendary Armenian king Ara the Handsome.

During the Arsacid period, Ayrarat referred to, in its narrowest sense, the royal domain consisting of the Ararat plain and its adjacent districts. The author of the seventh-century geography Ashkharhatsʻoytsʻ used the term Ayrarat to refer to a much larger territory. The name Ayrarat gradually fell out of use after the fall of the Bagratid Kingdom of Armenia and the conquest of Armenia by the Seljuks in the eleventh century.

Districts
The seventh-century Ashkharhatsʻoytsʻ attributed to Anania Shirakatsi depicts Ayrarat as a very large province with 22 districts, but this is probably based on the new administrative divisions created after the Byzantine-Persian partition of Armenia in 591. 
Shirak
Aragatsotn
Nig
Varazhnunik
Vostan Hayots
Vanand
Masyats-Votn
Kogovit
Basean
Bagrewand
Chakatk
Abeghyan
Havnunik
Arshanunik
Tsaghkotn
Arats
Urtsadzor
Vostan Dvna
Kotayk
Mazaz

See also
List of regions of old Armenia

References

Bibliography 

 
 
 
 
 
 

Provinces of the Kingdom of Armenia (antiquity)
History of Ağrı Province
History of Kars Province